Prephytoene-diphosphate synthase may refer to:
 All-trans-phytoene synthase, an enzyme
 Phytoene synthase, an enzyme